Wisła Kraków known as Wisła Can-Pack Kraków for sponsorship reasons, is a Polish professional women's basketball club that was founded in 1906 in the city of Kraków. Wisła plays in the Basket Liga Kobiet, the highest competition in Poland. and have previously played in the EuroLeague Women.

Titles
 EuroLeague Women
 2nd place: 1970
 4th place in Final Four: 2010
 8th place in Final Eight: 2012
 Polish Championship (25): 1963, 1964, 1965, 1966, 1968, 1969, 1970, 1971, 1975, 1976, 1977, 1979, 1980, 1981, 1984, 1985, 1988, 2006, 2007, 2008, 2011, 2012, 2014, 2015, 2016
 2nd place (12): 1952, 1967, 1972, 1973, 1974, 1983, 1987, 1992, 1999, 2005, 2013, 2017
 3rd place (9): 1951, 1959, 1960, 1961, 1962, 1982, 1998, 2000, 2009
 Polish Cup (13): 1959, 1960, 1961, 1966, 1967, 1979, 1984, 2006, 2009, 2012, 2014, 2015, 2017
 Polish Super Cup (2): 2008, 2009
 PZKosz Cup (1): 1984

Current roster

Notable former players

See also 
 Wisła Kraków - men's football team

References

External links
Official Website

Sport in Kraków
EuroLeague Women clubs
Women's basketball teams in Poland
Basketball teams established in 1906
1906 establishments in Austria-Hungary
Wisła Kraków